Xanməmmədli or Khanmamedli may refer to:
 Xanməmmədli, Neftchala, Azerbaijan
 Xanməmmədli, Zardab, Azerbaijan